Kentucky Route 33 (KY 33) is a , two-lane, north–south state highway in Kentucky managed by the Kentucky Transportation Cabinet.

KY 33 begins at US 150 in Danville and proceeds north through Boyle,  Mercer, Jessamine, and Woodford counties before terminating at US 62 in Versailles. 
It shares the road with US 68 in Jessamine and Mercer counties and crosses the Kentucky River near Wilmore.

Major intersections

Alternate names
KY 33 has other names along its path:
Third Street in Danville
Shakertown Road in Boyle County and Danville
Danville Burgin Road in Mercer County
Danville Street in Burgin
Pleasant Hill Road in Burgin and Mercer County
Shakertown Road in Mercer County
Lexington Road (US 68) in Mercer County
Harrodsburg Road (US 68) in Jessamine County
Pekin Pike in Woodford and Jessamine Counties
Troy Pike in Woodford County
Main Street in Versailles

References

External links
 Kentucky Roads - KY 33
 State Primary Road System in Woodford County
 State Primary Road System in Jessamine County
 State Primary Road System in Mercer County
 State Primary Road System in Boyle County

0033